John S. Greenspan (born 7 January 1938, in London), is an academic dentist/scientist and university administrator. His degrees and diplomas include BSc, BDS, PhD, FRCPath, FDSRCS (Eng). He is the Director-Emeritus of the AIDS Research Institute at the University of California, San Francisco (UCSF). He was also the founding Director of the UCSF AIDS Specimen Bank (1982-2017) and of the UCSF Oral AIDS Center (1986–2005).

Early life and education 
Greenspan is a Distinguished Professor-Emeritus of Oral Pathology in the Department of Orofacial Sciences and he is also the former Associate Dean for Global Oral Health and for Research and Graduate Education in the School of Dentistry as well as of Pathology in the School of Medicine at UCSF. He is a Fellow of King's College, London. He has been a faculty member at UCSF since 1976. His early education was at the Royal Liberty School, Romford, Essex and at Hendon County School, Hendon, Middlesex, England. His university education was at the Royal Dental Hospital School of Dental Surgery (BDS), Royal School Free Hospital School of Medicine where he earned a BSc First in Anatomy, the Royal Postgraduate Medical School with AGE Pearse (PhD) and St George's Hospital School of Medicine (M then FRCPath), all schools of the University of London.

Work 
In 1996-97 he was the Burroughs-Wellcome Professor of the UK Royal Society of Medicine and in 2010 the Distinguished Scientist Award recipient of the American Association for Dental Research (AADR). He is a Member of the US National Academy of Medicine and in 1990 he was awarded the honorary degree of ScD by Georgetown University. In 2012, he was awarded the triennial American Dental Association Gold Medal Award for Excellence in Dental Research.  He is also a Past-President of the American Association for Dental Research 1988-1989 and of the International Association for Dental Research 1996–1997. He was also the founding President of the International Association for Dental Research Global Oral Health Inequalities Research Network (IADR-GOHIRN) and of the Consortium of Universities for Global Health's Global Oral Health Interest Group (GOHIG).

He was for 20 years a Division, then Department Chair at UCSF, where he was a prime mover in building the science of that School, leading to it being the leader in USA dental schools’extramural funding for 25 years. He has been Chair of the Faculty of the School of Dentistry, Chair of the San Francisco Division of the UC Academic Senate and has served on and chaired many Senate and campus, also Systemwide committees. He and his spouse and colleague Deborah Greenspan were jointly the recipients of the UCSF Faculty Senate Campuswide Research Lecture Award in Translational Science in 2014, the first time in the history of UCSF that this honor was bestowed on School of Dentistry faculty members. He was previously Senior Lecturer/Consultant at the Royal Dental Hospital School of Dental Surgery as well as Consultant at St George's Hospital and St John's Hospital for Skin Diseases in London, conducting the Royal's Oral Pathology service and also responsible for the oral medicine clinic. He has supervised and/or mentored over 120 physician/scientists, dentist/scientists and PhD scientists in aspects of oral pathology and medicine, AIDS/HIV, global oral health and related topics. Greenspan is President of the Emeriti Faculty Association of UCSF and Chair of the School of Dentistry Dean's Advisory Committee.

Greenspan's oral disease research interests center on the epidemiology, etiopathogenesis and management of oral soft tissue diseases, notably those associated with HIV infection and other causes of immunosuppression, as well as aphthous ulcers, Sjögren syndrome, and oral cancer/pre-cancer. These topics have led to broad explorations in epidemiology, public/global health, policy, implementation science and other areas. He served until 2005 as founding Director of the UCSF Oral AIDS Center (OAC), which was supported by the NIDCR for 20 years. The OAC continues its research on the pathogenesis of oral lesions associated with HIV infection. He is part of a team looking into the molecular pathogenesis of Epstein–Barr virus-associated hairy leukoplakia. Hairy leukoplakia is a lesion that Deborah Greenspan and he discovered, and in 1985 they identified a connection between it and Epstein–Barr virus (EBV).

He was the founding co-Principal Investigator of the National Institute for Dental and Craniofacial Research-funded International Research Registry Network for Sjögren syndrome (SICCA) and continues to participate in the project. He has been the recipient of over $70 million in total costs of research grants and contract funding from Federal, State and industry agencies in 42 years at UCSF. He was among the top 5% of NIH awardees by total funding in the 25 years through 2007. He has published over 300 papers and four books on oral aspects of AIDS, oral pathology, and immunopathology. He has been a featured speaker at many international meetings and has presented over 300 research papers, clinics, and postgraduate courses. He has been an associate editor or board member of several journals and was a founding editor of Oral Diseases.

References

External links 
 John Greenspan, USCF Profile

Living people
1938 births
UCSF School of Medicine faculty
American neurologists
HIV/AIDS researchers
Fellows of King's College London